Kate Mansi is an American actress. She is best known for playing the role of Abigail Deveraux on the NBC serial Days of Our Lives from 2011 to 2016, for which in 2017, she won the Daytime Emmy Award for Outstanding Supporting Actress in a Drama Series. She returned to the role in 2018, last appearing in May 2020.

Early life and career
Kate Mansi was born Katharine Theresa Rose Morris in Calabasas, California, to parents Jeff and Victoria Morris in Southern California. She is of English, Irish and Italian descent, and she studied film and public relations at Pepperdine University, where she graduated with a Bachelor of Arts degree.

Until the end of 2016, Mansi played Abby on Days of Our Lives. Mansi returned to Days of Our Lives in November 2018 for a short-term period of time and then again in 2019 at which point she resumed the role of Abigail up to the present time.

In 2013, Mansi launched a campaign to raise $20,000 for Charity: Water, "giving up" her birthday to raise awareness for the cause of clean water. She announced through her Twitter account on December 30 that she succeeded in raising the full amount.

Filmography

Awards and nominations

References

External links
 
 
 

Living people
21st-century American actresses
American soap opera actresses
Daytime Emmy Award winners
Daytime Emmy Award for Outstanding Supporting Actress in a Drama Series winners
American people of Irish descent
American people of Italian descent
People from Calabasas, California
Year of birth missing (living people)